The Delegation is a 2018 Albanian drama film directed by Bujar Alimani. It was selected as the Albanian entry for the Best International Feature Film at the 92nd Academy Awards, but it was not nominated.

Plot
In October 1990, a European delegation arrives in Tirana to determine Albania's readiness for entry into the Organization for Security and Co-operation in Europe. To boost their chances, Albania's struggling communist government plans the release of a political prisoner when things go awry.

Cast
 Viktor Zhusti as Leo
 Xhevdet Ferri as Asllan
 Ndriçim Xhepa as Spiro
 Richard Sammel as Head of the Delegation

Awards

See also
 List of submissions to the 92nd Academy Awards for Best International Feature Film
 List of Albanian submissions for the Academy Award for Best International Feature Film

References

External links
 

2018 films
2018 drama films
Albanian drama films
Albanian-language films